Leśnica  is a village in the administrative district of Gmina Bukowina Tatrzańska, within Tatra County, Lesser Poland Voivodeship, in southern Poland, close to the border with Slovakia.

The village has a population of 1,200. It has a few small stores along with a church and elementary school. It is very rural, with most of the residents owning animals and having small farms. The nearest city is Nowy Targ, where most of the residents do their shopping and where students go to for high school.

Demographics

References

Villages in Tatra County